The Norma Farber First Book Award is given by the Poetry Society of America "for a first book of original poetry written by an American and published in either a hard or soft cover in a standard edition during the calendar year".

The award was established by the family and friends of the poet and children's book author Norma Farber. The award comes with a $500 prize.

Winners

See also
American poetry
List of poetry awards
List of literary awards
List of years in poetry
List of years in literature

Notes

External links
Poetry Society of America Awards Guidelines page

American poetry awards
First book awards